Paper Empire is the seventh studio album by the New Orleans-based rock trio Better Than Ezra, released on May 12, 2009, through Red Distribution. It is the first album to feature new drummer Michael Jerome following the departure of former drummer Travis McNabb in February 2009 after 13 years with Better Than Ezra. Album art and packaging were designed by Lorin Brown at One & Done Studio.

Songs
Better Than Ezra vocalist Kevin Griffin co-wrote nine of the twelve songs on Paper Empire. Griffin co-wrote four songs with songwriter busbee, who also wrote the Rascal Flatts single "Summer Nights". The track "Hey Love" was co-written by Griffin and country music songwriter Monty Powell.

"Absolutely Still", the album's first single, was co-written with Val Emmich, whose version of the song appears on the Emmich's album "Sunlight Searchparty". However, Emmich departed his label, Epic Records, before "Sunlight Searchparty" was released. Griffin decided that "Absolutely Still" had potential and re-recorded it with Better Than Ezra for the album.

"Just One Day" and "Fit" were also co-written with singer-songwriter Jeremy Lister. Lister's versions of the songs appear on his 2007 debut album, Just One Day EP, released by Warner Bros. Records.

The track "All In" was written by James Bourne, a former member of the guitar-pop band Busted (which also performs back-up vocals on the track).

Track listing
All lyrics and music by Kevin Griffin, except where noted.

Personnel
 Kevin Griffin - Guitar, Piano, Vocals
 Tom Drummond - Bass
 Michael Jerome - Drums
 Tim Palmer - Mixing

References

External links
 Better Than Ezra official website
 Better Than Ezra Wiki
 One & Done Studio

2009 albums
Better Than Ezra albums
Albums produced by Warren Huart
Megaforce Records albums